Lamia Football Club is a Greek professional football club based in Lamia, Greece. It was founded in 1964. The club plays in the Super League, the first tier of Greek football. It plays its home matches at the Lamia Municipal Stadium.

History

Foundation and early years
On 1 June 1964, when the representatives of the clubs of Fthiotida decided to "carve out" a common course, A.S. Lamia was established. In order to reach the final decision, it took a long time and endless hours of negotiations. The "Queen of Fthiotida", as it is called, comes from the merger of Lamiakos and Palamiaki.

In 1961 Hellenic Football Federation decided that from the next season (1962–63) the 2nd National Division, at which Olympiacos Lamia would compete at that time, would consist of 60 teams divided into four groups and the champion from each group would also take the rally for the First National. As a result, at the end of the 1961–62 championship in a general assembly held by the members of Olympiacos Lamia (17 June 1962), they decided to propose to Palamiaki their merger and the creation of a new club and while initially the answer to the "yellow-black" was affirmative, their suggestion that the new group be called Palamiaky was not accepted and so "marriage ended in divorce".

The sinking of the negotiations with Palamiaki led to the new general assembly the members of Olympiacos (24 July 1962), where it was decided to merge the "redcurrants" with the Pamfthiotikos, named Lamiakos, who represented the prefecture in B National in the period 1963–64, but in the same year, the ticket for the category took and Palamiaiki as the champion of the National Team, with the result that Lamia was represented by two clubs in the category. This was also the time to create an association that would come from the union of the largest groups in the city.

On 25 May 1964, at the initiative of the then mayor of Lamia and the football players of the prefecture, a general meeting was held, which did not have the expected result, as it initially resulted in the creation of two new clubs of the AS. Lamia and the AS Thermopylae, however, a week later, on 1 June 1964, it was decided that the latter merged with AS. Ghoul.

Major paths
Although the "Cyan-Whites" had reached six times near the First National, they had not managed to rise to the first category (until 2017). Nevertheless, their course over the years, combined with the remarkable appearances against the great forces of Greek football in the institution of the cup (2–1 and 1–0 with AEK and with Panathinaikos in the defeat of 1–5, but with the hosts leading to the 15th with Rizopoulos' head and accepting four goals after the first ten minutes of the extension), they have made PAS Lamia 1964 particularly popular in the prefecture of Fthiotida.

Recent years
PAS Lamia came close to rising in the 2nd National Championship after many years in 2006–07, but eventually finished fourth. During the 2007–08 season and while there were administrative changes, the international player of AEK and Olympiacos, Daniel Batista, was recruited as a coach, but again he did not manage to distinguish himself, winning 13th place with difficulty, ensuring the stay in category 3, bringing 40 points, just 7 over the relegation zone. The following year (2008–09) they were downgraded to D National Division.

In the summer of 2012, Lamia merged with Agrotis Lianokladi, who at that time were in D Ethniki, replacing them in the category, renamed PAS Lamia 1964. In the period 2012–13 they finished first in the 4th group in the regional championship, leaving A.O. Karditsa 5 points behind. At the same time they also won the Cup of Fthiotida, defeating Achilles Domokos with 3–1 in the final.

The following year (2013–14) they finished first in their group at the Gamma Ethniki, ensuring the rise for the second division (Football League) in 2014–15. During the 2014–15 season they competed in the 2nd League of the Football League, where they gained the fourth position. The following year (2015–16) they were ranked fifth in the same championship.

Promotion to the Super League
In the 2016–17 season, PAS Lamia won the promotion to the Super League (2017–18) for the first time in their history in Greek football.

Crest and colours

Crest
Historically the emblem of AS Lamia is the letter "L" in blue or white color as it was decided at the founding of the club on 1 June 1964. This was the emblem until the period 1978–79. At that time the coat of arms with vertical blue and white stripes was used as an emblem. The coat of arms or letter "L" in turn was the emblem of the club until the period 1994–95. In the race season 1995–96, the white and blue stripes were used for the first time and the letter "L" was included in the coat of arms.
In the period 1999–00, when Lamia fought in the Delta Ethniki used the Rainbow Coat as an emblem. That year the team won the championship. In 2008, during Lamias' stay in Pelion for pre-season preparation, used as a coat of arms in a training suit a coat of arms between laurels with Latin characters LFC and 1964, which is the year of founding the club.

The emblem that uses the club today was presented in 2014 and depicts Athanasios Diakos, the hero of Roumeli, in his upper right hand side.

Colours
The colours of the club are cyan and white.

Stadium

Lamia Municipal Stadium is a stadium located in the city of Lamia, in the Prefecture of Fthiotida in Central Greece. It is the headquarters of PAS Lamia since the founding of a club.
It was built in 1952 and belongs to the Municipality of Lamia. The stadium is located in the northern part of Lamia, next to the local Town Hall and is part of Lamia Municipal Sports Center (DAK of Lamia).
Its capacity is 5,500 seats, making it the twelfth largest stadium in the Football League for the 2014–15 season. The stadium was rebuilt in 2004 and 2008, and blue plastic seats were added to all the stands.
The record of attendance at the Lamia Municipal Stadium took place on 31 March 1968, in a match between Lamia and Trikala, with 11,502 fans staying at the stadium stage.
In the summer of 2017 the stadium was renovated to license PAS Lamia in the Super League. So, five new headlamps were added for better illumination of the pitch and also new seats. In addition, the main stadium of the stadium was built, the changing rooms, benches and much more were renovated.

Honours and achievements

Domestic competitions
Leagues:
Football League 2
  Winners (2): 1972–73, 2013–14
Delta Ethniki
  Winners (5): 1989–90, 1993–94, 1999–00, 2003–04, 2012–13

Cups:
Greek Cup
 Semi-finals (3): 2018–19, 2021–22, 2022–23

Regional competitions
Leagues:
Phthiotis FCA Championship
  Winners (1): 1972–73

Cups:
Phthiotis FCA Cup
  Winners (9): 1972–73, 1981–82, 1988–89, 1989–90, 1993–94, 1998–99, 1999–00, 2002–03, 2012–13

Seasons in the 21st century 

Best position in bold.

Key: 3R = Third Round, 4R = Fourth Round, 5R = Fifth Round, GS = Group Stage, QF = Quarter-finals, SF = Semi-finals.

Players

Current squad

Out on loan

Personnel

Ownership and current board

|}

Coaching staff

|}

Medical staff

|}

References

External links

 Official website 
 Lamia at Super League 
 Lamia at UEFA 
 Lamia's news (in Greek)

 
Football clubs in Central Greece
Association football clubs established in 1964
1964 establishments in Greece
Lamia (city)
Sport in Phthiotis